Malad (Pronunciation: [maːlaːɖ]; station code: MDD) is a railway station on the Western line of the Mumbai Suburban Railway network. It serves the suburb of Malad.

References

Railway stations in Mumbai Suburban district
Mumbai Suburban Railway stations
Mumbai WR railway division